Gary LeRoi Gray (born February 12, 1987) is an American actor, who has appeared in movies, television and animation.

Early life
Gary LeRoi Gray was born on February 12, 1987, in Chicago Illinois.

Career
He is best known for his childhood role as Nelson Tibideaux, the son of Sondra Huxtable Tibideaux and Elvin Tibideaux on the NBC sitcom The Cosby Show. He appeared on the series during its eighth and final season (1991–1992). He also is known for his role as Nelson Minkler in the Disney Channel sitcom Even Stevens, and as the voice of A.J. in The Fairly OddParents.

Gray's voice roles include Charley on Clifford the Big Red Dog, A. J. on The Fairly OddParents (replacing Ibrahim Haneef Muhammad in that role), Sam "The Squid" Dullard on Rocket Power and Mitch in Whatever Happened to Robot Jones?. Recurring live-action roles have included Nelson Tibideaux on The Cosby Show, Nelson Minkler on Even Stevens, and Bobby the Inquisitive Boy on The Weird Al Show.

Filmography

Television

Video games

References

External links

Living people
American male child actors
American male film actors
American male television actors
American male video game actors
American male voice actors
20th-century American male actors
21st-century American male actors
Place of birth missing (living people)
1987 births